The History of Comedy is a CNN documentary series, as part of CNN Original Series.

The documentary explores the underlying questions of what makes American people laugh, why, and how the laughter influenced their social and political landscape throughout American history.

The show utilizes archival footage, punctuated by contemporary interviews with comedians and scholars.

Series overview

Episodes

Season 1 (2017)

Season 2 (2018)

History of the Sitcom
In 2021, CNN followed their comedy history docuseries with History of the Sitcom, an eight-part series which traced the development of the American situation comedy show from the 1950s to the 21st Century. The show features 184 interviews with creatives, actors and directors including Norman Lear, Mel Brooks and Carl Reiner (in his last recorded interview).

References 

2017 American television series debuts
CNN original programming
English-language television shows
2010s American documentary television series